Komijan (also Romanized as Komījān and Komeyjān; also known as Khūmajān, Komāzān, Komejān, Komīzān, and Kūmīzān) is a city and capital of Komijan County, Markazi Province, Iran.  At the 2006 census, its population was 7,358, in 2,004 families.

History 
The 14th-century author Hamdallah Mustawfi listed Komijan (as Kūmjān) as one of the main villages in the Sharahin district under Hamadan.

District

 GHALEH: The area is considered the highest point of the city and the urban fabric of the old location, which is called the city of Bam.
 OLD GHALEH: The area of the neighborhood near the intersection Mahdiyeh Njarlar 16 meters from the street, which is one of the neighborhoods of Old komijan. This place is a mosque called the Masjid Mosque Zaman the old mosque and the Grand Parad Rah is considered that the establishment of local Friday Prayers as well.
 SARAB
 ESSA ABAD
 ANAR: Anar was originally separated from Komijan and was located in its east, but due to its very short distance, it was gradually connected to Komijan through the construction of residential and commercial places and became one of the large neighborhoods of Komijan. The entrance of Komijan city is from Arak side of this neighborhood, which is one of the big and famous neighborhoods of this city. (Azad and Payame Noor Universities, Hospital, Road and Transportation Department, Welfare and Groundwater Department are located in this neighborhood.) This village itself has three neighborhoods called Qala-e-Miandeh-Qala-e-Bala and Ken-e-Icheh and Qala-e-Gol Ahmad. It is called Anar (very bright) because it has many springs such as Tik and Bolagh springs and mills and old and large water aqueducts or because it has active Zoroastrian fire temples. One of the largest tribes is Anari and Mohammad Karim, which can be seen in its population dispersion in the villages of Rastkordan and Qazooq, as well as Rahan (Saqarjuq, Dastjan and Zanjeiran, Kudzar and Aghaziart). Chehrgazi hill is located in the northern part of this large neighborhood. Agricultural lands and good weather make this neighborhood a place for guests to spend the summer, especially in hot summers. It has the most cultivated lands in the city in terms of population and has very fertile soil, so that in the past it was considered one of the most important properties of the Bahadori family (Jafar Khan Bahadori, son of Ibrahim Khan Asem Al-Saltanah Bahadori). Other clans in this neighborhood include Anari, Azimi, Kadivar, Moradi, Alizadeh Bastan and Pezeshki. The Pezeshki family is the founder of modern medicine and Manouchehr Khan Pezeshki is one of the residents of this large old village and the founder of modern education in the city. Most people work in agriculture, and in recent years young people have turned to government jobs. This neighborhood has been extended along the Komijan-Arak road since ancient times.
 GHOL ICHE
 ALI GHOLI BAGH
 FARHANGHIAN
 GHOLESTAN
 NAJARLAR
 MASKAN MEHR
 YOKHRE HASAR
 HASSAN ABAD

Geography

Climate
The annual precipitation averages .

Village Life 

Although many people live in Komijan, its numbers are decreasing as many leave Komijan to go and live in Tehran or other main cities of Iran. Some of the summer resorts around Komijan are Teraran (darband), Vafs. The Vafs spa is a touristic place around Komijan. Tourists of the villages usually visit them in the summer.

Economy
Komijan produces large amounts of wheat and cotton. It is also well known for its pomegranates and melons. The major product of horticulture and cultivation in the city of Kamijan is grapes and almonds. Komijan Industrial City, the largest industrial city in Iran, is located in Komijan.

Universities 

Three universities are situated in Komijan, namely the Komijan branch of the Komijan University, Islamic Azad University of komijan and the Komijan branch of the Payame Noor University. Komijan City is situated in Komijan County.

See also

Fakhr-al-Din Iraqi
 Komijan Industrial Town

References

External links

 Official website Komijan
 

Populated places in Komijan County

Cities in Markazi Province